Senjed Boland-e Olya (also Romanized as Senjed Boland-e ‘Olyā; also known as Sanjed Boland-e Bālā) is a village in Hoseynabad-e Goruh Rural District, Rayen District, Kerman County, Kerman Province, Iran. At the 2006 census, its population was 41, in 9 families.

References 

Populated places in Kerman County